Varvarinsky is a rural locality (a settlement) in Bauntovsky District, Republic of Buryatia, Russia. The population was 162 as of 2010. There are 3 streets.

Geography 
Varvarinsky is located 34 km west of Bagdarin (the district's administrative centre) by road.

References 

Rural localities in Bauntovsky District